The 1976–77 Drexel Dragons men's basketball team represented Drexel University during the 1976–77 men's basketball season. The Dragons, led by 6th year head coach Ray Haesler, played their home games at the Daskalakis Athletic Center and were members of the East Coast Conference (ECC).

The team finished the season 11–13, and finished in 6th place in the ECC East in the regular season.

Roster

Schedule

|-
!colspan=9 style="background:#F8B800; color:#002663;"| Regular season
|-

Awards
Bob Stephens
Converse Honorable Mention All-American
Sporting News Honorable Mention All-American
Herb Good Sportswriters Society All-Philadelphia Area Team
ECC All-Conference Second Team
Albright College Invitational Tournament MVP
Albright College Invitational All-Tournament Team

References

Drexel Dragons men's basketball seasons
Drexel
1976 in sports in Pennsylvania
1977 in sports in Pennsylvania